José Antonio Espín Puerta (born 9 February 1985) is a Spanish professional footballer who plays for CF Villanovense as a centre-back.

Club career
Born in Murcia, Espín finished his youth career at Real Valladolid's youth system, and made his senior debuts with Pinatar CF in the fourth division. In the same tier, he also played for Orihuela CF and Ciudad de Murcia's reserves.

On 26 May 2007, Espín made his second level debut with the latter's first team, playing three minutes against CD Numancia. He finished the season with a further two league appearances, totalling just 147 minutes of action. 

In the summer of 2007, Espín joined division three side Real Jaén. Two years later, he renewed his contract with the Andalusians for another two years.

On the last day of 2011 winter transfer window, Espín signed a six-month deal with SD Eibar also in the third division. On 9 July 2012 he returned to the level above, after agreeing to a one-year contract with CD Guadalajara.

On 14 June 2014, aged 28, Espín moved abroad for the first time in his career, joining Football League (Greece) club Athlitiki Enosi Larissa FC. On 24 December, however, he returned to his homeland, signing with second level's CD Mirandés.

References

External links

1985 births
Living people
Spanish footballers
Spanish expatriate footballers
Footballers from Murcia
Association football defenders
Segunda División players
Segunda División B players
Tercera División players
Pinatar CF players
Orihuela CF players
Ciudad de Murcia footballers
Real Jaén footballers
SD Eibar footballers
CD Guadalajara (Spain) footballers
CD Mirandés footballers
Huracán Valencia CF players
CF Villanovense players
CD Ebro players
Athlitiki Enosi Larissa F.C. players
Spanish expatriate sportspeople in Greece
Expatriate footballers in Greece